Amazonas is a department of Southern Colombia in the south of the country. It is the largest department in area while also having the 3rd smallest population. Its capital is Leticia and its name comes from the Amazon River, which drains the department.

Toponymy 
The department name comes from the name of the Amazon River. The river was named by the Spanish explorer Francisco de Orellana (1511 - 1546), who, on his voyage of exploration, said he was attacked by "fierce females"   looked like Amazons of the Greek mythology, however, the existence of a female warrior tribe in that time hasn't been demonstrated and it is possible that they were long-haired Native American warriors who impressed the conqueror who called the jungle and the river with the name of Amazon.

Demographics 
The following ethnic groups are found in the department: Bora, Cocama, Macuna, Mirana, Okaina, Ticunas, Tucano, Uitoto, Yagua, and Yucuna, among others. 
These groups are more than 5,000 years old.

National parks 

There are currently four "National Parks" (Amacayacú, Cahuinarí, Rio Puree, and Yagoje Apaporis).

Municipalities and communities 

 El Encanto
 La Chorrera
 La Pedrera
 La Victoria
 Leticia
 Mirití-Paraná
 Puerto Alegría
 Puerto Arica
 Puerto Nariño
 Puerto Santander
 Tarapacá

See also 
Amazonas State, Venezuela
Amazonas State, Brazil

References

External links 
 
Territorial-Environmental Information System of Colombian Amazon SIAT-AC website
 Essential Travel Information to Leticia and its Surroundings

 
Departments of Colombia
States and territories established in 1991
1991 establishments in Colombia